The painted delma (Delma petersoni) is a species of lizard in the Pygopodidae family endemic to Australia.

References

Pygopodids of Australia
Delma
Reptiles described in 1991
Endemic fauna of Australia